Herndon is a city in Rawlins County, Kansas, United States. As of the 2020 census, the population of the city was 119.

History
Herndon was originally called Pesth (named after Pest, Hungary, which later merged to become Budapest) and under the latter name was laid out in 1878. It was renamed Herndon in 1879, in honor of William H. Herndon, law partner of Abraham Lincoln.  Herndon was incorporated as a city in 1906.

Geography
Herndon is located at  (39.909468, -100.786094).

Demographics

2010 census
As of the census of 2010, there were 129 people, 66 households, and 33 families residing in the city. The racial makeup of the city was 94.6% White, 2.3% African American, and 3.1% from two or more races. Hispanic or Latino of any race were 1.6% of the population.

There were 66 households, of which 18.2% had children under the age of 18 living with them, 40.9% were married couples living together, 1.5% had a female householder with no husband present, 7.6% had a male householder with no wife present, and 50.0% were non-families. 42.4% of all households were made up of individuals, and 13.6% had someone living alone who was 65 years of age or older. The average household size was 1.95 and the average family size was 2.70.

The median age in the city was 51.1 years. 17.8% of residents were under the age of 18; 7% were between the ages of 18 and 24; 16.4% were from 25 to 44; 33.4% were from 45 to 64; and 25.6% were 65 years of age or older. The gender makeup of the city was 51.2% male and 48.8% female.

2000 census
As of the census of 2000, there were 149 people, 83 households, and 37 families residing in the city. The racial makeup of the city was 99.33% White, and 0.67% from two or more races.

There were 83 households, out of which 18.1% had children under the age of 18 living with them, 34.9% were married couples living together, 8.4% had a female householder with no husband present, and 55.4% were non-families. 54.2% of all households were made up of individuals, and 33.7% had someone living alone who was 65 years of age or older. The average household size was 1.80 and the average family size was 2.76.

In the city, the population was spread out, with 18.8% under the age of 18, 3.4% from 18 to 24, 17.4% from 25 to 44, 20.8% from 45 to 64, and 39.6% who were 65 years of age or older. The median age was 52 years. For every 100 females, there were 101.4 males. For every 100 females age 18 and over, there were 83.3 males.

The median income for a household in the city was $17,250, and the median income for a family was $24,583. Males had a median income of $31,563 versus $11,875 for females. The per capita income for the city was $23,005. There were 7.7% of families and 12.3% of the population living below the poverty line, including 17.8% of under eighteens and 9.8% of those over 64.

Area events
 Herndon Ox Roast - occurs every 5 years.  Ox Roast kicks off the day with a parade followed by a lunch of pit smoked beef, live music, cow patty bingo, and an outhouse race in the afternoon. To end the day of events, a street dance is held on the Main Street of Herndon.  Thousands attend this day long event.

Education
The community is served by Rawlins County USD 105 public school district, formed in 2003 by the consolidation of Herndon USD 317 and Atwood USD 318. Residents attend school in Atwood: Rawlins County Elementary School and Rawlins County Junior-Senior High School.

Herndon schools were closed in 2004 through school unification. The Herndon High School mascot was Herndon Beavers.

Notable people
 Rudolph Wendelin, Forest Service artist behind Smokey Bear.

References

Further reading

External links

 City of Herndon
 Herndon - Directory of Public Officials
 Herndon city map, KDOT

Cities in Kansas
Cities in Rawlins County, Kansas
1878 establishments in Kansas
Populated places established in 1878